Iowa Highway 28 is a  state highway located in south central Iowa.  The route begins at Iowa Highway 92 at Martensdale and ends at Interstate 35 / Interstate 80 in Johnston.  It is the first major north–south highway east of Interstate 35 in the Des Moines metropolitan area.

Route description

Iowa Highway 28 begins at Iowa Highway 92 at Martensdale in Warren County. From Martensdale, it continues north through Prole and Norwalk before crossing into Polk County. Just across the county line, Iowa 28 meets Iowa Highway 5 at a partial-cloverleaf interchange. Just north of the interchange is Army Post Road, a former alignment of Iowa Highway 5. Iowa 28 crosses the Raccoon River just south of Railroad Avenue in West Des Moines. From the river to the Interstate 235 interchange, the east side of the street is 63rd Street in Des Moines, while the west side of the street is 1st Street in West Des Moines. The dual designation of street names is particularly confusing to drivers and residents alike. North of I-235, Iowa 28 continues north through Windsor Heights until reaching U.S. Highway 6 at Hickman Road in Des Moines. US 6 and Iowa 28 split at Douglas Avenue near Merle Hay Mall. Iowa 28 continues north along the Urbandale / Des Moines city limit line before ending at exit 131 of Interstate 35 / Interstate 80 at the Johnston / Urbandale city limit line.

History
Iowa Highway 28 was designated on 16 October 1926 from Iowa Highway 2 in Martensdale to U.S. Highway 65 in Des Moines. Iowa 28's routing changed often until 1961 when it ended at Army Post Road. In 1980, it was extended northward to Hickman Road. In 1990 it was extended northward its current northern end when Iowa Highway 401 was turned over to local jurisdictions. Iowa 401 ran from the current US 6 / Iowa 28 intersection near Merle Hay Mall to Camp Dodge in Johnston. In 1995, Iowa 28 was expanded to four lanes road between Grand Avenue and Army Post Road.  When the Iowa Highway 5 freeway was built, a diagonal connector was built from the freeway to Army Post Road. Upon completion, Iowa 28 was shifted to the new diagonal road and the old segments became Iowa Highway 296, an unsigned designation. By March 2011, the final segment of Iowa 296 had been turned over to local jurisdictions.

Major intersections

References

External links

End of Iowa 28 at Iowa Highway Ends

028
Transportation in Warren County, Iowa
Transportation in Polk County, Iowa